Jurica Bajić (born 29 February 2000) is a Croatian footballer who plays for Cibalia as a midfielder.

Club career
Bajić made his professional Fortuna Liga debut for FK Senica against MŠK Žilina on 8 August 2020.

References

External links
 FK Senica official club profile 
 
 Futbalnet profile 
 

2000 births
Living people
Sportspeople from Vinkovci
Association football midfielders
Croatian footballers
Croatia youth international footballers
HNK Hajduk Split players
FK Senica players
HNK Cibalia players
Slovak Super Liga players
First Football League (Croatia) players
Croatian expatriate footballers
Expatriate footballers in Slovakia
Croatian expatriate sportspeople in Slovakia